Elections for Hammersmith and Fulham Council in London were held on 6 May 2010.  The 2010 United Kingdom General Election and other local elections took place on the same day.

In London council elections the entire council is elected every four years, as opposed to some local elections where one councillor is elected every year in three of the four years.

Summary of results

After taking control four years previously at the last election, the Conservative Party maintained control - with just two seats changing hands.

Ward results

The borough is divided into 16 electoral wards, all bar two electing three councillors apiece.

Addison

Askew

Avonmore & Brook Green

College Park & Old Oak

Fulham Broadway

Fulham Reach

Hammersmith Broadway

Munster

North End

Palace Riverside

Parson's Green & Walham

Ravenscourt Park

Sands End

Shepherd's Bush Green

Town

Wormholt & White City

References

2010
Hammersmith and Fulham
Hammersmith and Fulham London Borough Council election
21st century in the London Borough of Hammersmith and Fulham